Félix Maritaud (born 12 December 1992) is a French actor notable for his roles in French queer cinema.

Career 
Maritaud began to garner recognition after starring in a string of French independent films, most notably BPM (Beats per Minute). The French LGBT magazine Têtu dubbed him "the new hero of French queer cinema".

In 2018, Maritaud attracted further attention for his role in the independent film Sauvage, in which he played a homeless sex worker. Peter Bradshaw of The Guardian wrote that "Maritaud’s performance has power". Tara Brady of The Irish Times wrote, "Félix Maritaud is a heartbreaking revelation as a sex worker seeking intimacy in France". Dazed called his performance a "raw, delicate depiction". He won the Lumières Award for Most Promising Actor at the 24th Lumières Awards, for his performance in Sauvage.

In 2019, Maritaud was featured in Gaspar Noé's Lux Æterna. It was screened out of competition at the 2019 Cannes Film Festival.

In 2020, Maritaud starred in a French short film titled Dustin, which was an official selection of the 2020 Cannes Film Festival, but was not able to be screened due to the cancellation of the festival in light of the COVID-19 pandemic in France. It was subsequently screened at the 2020 Toronto International Film Festival, where it was named the winner of the IMDbPro Short Cuts Award for Best International Short Film.

Personal life 
He is openly gay.

Filmography

References

External links
 
 

Living people
1992 births
French male film actors
French gay actors
Gay pornographic film actors
Place of birth missing (living people)
Most Promising Actor Lumières Award winners